During the 2000–01 season, Tottenham Hotspur participated in the English Premier League, FA Cup, and Football League Cup.

Season summary
Tottenham were thrown into turmoil on 16 March when it was announced that manager George Graham had been sacked for a breach of his contract. Countless names were linked with the vacancy and a popular decision was made two weeks later when it was announced that former player Glenn Hoddle would be returning to the club as manager. Despite the final documents completing the move not being agreed by Southampton on 30 March, a few days later the registration was released by the Saints which allowed Hoddle to officially take over the reins as Tottenham boss. A few weeks later, he re-signed Teddy Sheringham from Manchester United, as the first of many promised new signings, in a new-look side which many fans felt would be just the right set of players to bring the glory days back to White Hart Lane.

Final league table

Results summary

Results by matchday

Results
Tottenham Hotspur's score comes first

Legend

FA Premier League

FA Cup

League Cup

First-team squad
Squad at end of season

Left club during season

Reserve squad
The following players did not appear for the first team this season.

Statistics

Appearances

Goal scorers 

The list is sorted by shirt number when total goals are equal.

Clean sheets

The list is sorted by shirt number when total clean sheets are equal.

References

Tottenham Hotspur F.C. seasons
Tottenham Hotspur